The Julie Andrews Show is a television special that was broadcast by NBC in November 1965. Julie Andrews' guests included Gene Kelly and The New Christy Minstrels.

References

 Robert Windeler, Julie Andrews: A Biography (1970), p. 66.

External links
 

1965 television specials
1960s American television specials
NBC television specials
Peabody Award-winning broadcasts